The Lesser Antillean flycatcher (Myiarchus oberi) is a species of bird in the family Tyrannidae.
It is found in Barbuda, Dominica, Guadeloupe, Martinique, Saint Kitts and Nevis, and Saint Lucia.
Its natural habitat is subtropical or tropical moist lowland forests.

References

Lesser Antillean flycatcher
Birds of the Lesser Antilles
Lesser Antillean flycatcher
Taxonomy articles created by Polbot